The 2008 Blue Square UK Open was the sixth year of the PDC's UK Open darts tournament where, following numerous regional qualifying heats throughout Britain, players competed in a single elimination tournament to be crowned champion. The tournament was held at Bolton Wanderers' Reebok Stadium, Bolton, England, between 5–8 June 2008.

James Wade won the tournament; his first UK Open title, and his third major championship inside 12 months. He defeated American Gary Mawson in the final 11–7.

Format
As in previous years, eight regional UK Open events were staged across the UK where players winning were collated into the UK Order Of Merit. The top 128 players in the list, who played a minimum of three events (plus ties) won a place at the final stages.

The final UK Open Order of Merit qualifiers (146) were also joined by 32 Holsten qualifiers from pub tournaments throughout the UK. The Holsten qualifiers and the players outside the top 32 of the UK Open Order of Merit began the tournament on the Thursday night. They played down to 32 players, and they were joined by the top 32 of the UK Open Order of Merit the following night, to provide the competition's last 64. A random draw was made after each subsequent round

Prize money

Schedule
Preliminary & First round (Thursday, best of 11 legs): Holsten pub qualifiers and those lowest in the UK Open Order of Merit start the tournament here.
Second round (Thursday, best of 11 legs): The players just outside the top 32 in UK Open Order of Merit join preliminary and first round winners.
Third round (Last 64) (Friday, best of 17 legs): Top 32 in UK Open Order of Merit join the 32 survivors from the first night's play.
Fourth round (Last 32) (Saturday afternoon, best of 17 legs) 
Fifth round (Last 16) (Saturday evening, best of 17 legs) 
Quarter-finals (Sunday afternoon, best of 19 legs)
Semi-finals (Sunday evening, best of 19 legs)
Final (Sunday evening, best of 21 legs)

2007-2008 UK Open regional finals
There were eight regional final events staged between September 2007 and March 2008 to determine the UK Open Order of Merit Table. The tournament winners were:
23 September 2007 (Wales): James Wade 8-7 Raymond van Barneveld
7 October (Ireland): Raymond van Barneveld 8-2 Kevin McDine
21 October (Scotland): James Wade 8-2 Ronnie Baxter
13 January 2008 (North East): Colin Osborne 8-6 Denis Ovens
10 February 10 (South West): Colin Lloyd 8-6 Andy Hamilton
2 March (South): Colin Lloyd 8-6 Phil Taylor
16 March (North West): Phil Taylor 8-7 Adrian Lewis
30 March (Midlands): Phil Taylor 8-0 Brendan Dolan

Tournament review
The tournament has the nickname, the "FA Cup of darts" as a random draw is staged after each round. This provides no protection for the top players, who are usually seeded to avoid each other in early rounds.  Raymond van Barneveld and Phil Taylor, the top two in the PDC rankings respectively, met at the quarter-final stage for the third successive year, with the Dutchman coming out on top each occasion, this time 10-9. In addition, Adrian Lewis and Wayne Mardle - two players who played in the 2008 Premier League - played as early as the third Round, the last 64 stage.

Van Barneveld, who had won the tournament for the previous two years went out in the semi-finals to Gary Mawson, which was the Dutchman's first loss at the Reebok Stadium in the event. It also meant that Phil Taylor now overtook him to regain the top spot in the PDC Order of Merit/world rankings, as van Barneveld had failed to defend the £30,000 from the UK Open two years ago.

Earlier in the tournament, Phil Taylor threw his fourth nine dart leg in six years in the UK Open, during a 9-1 victory over Jamie Harvey in the fourth Round. In his Fifth round match against Wesley Newton, Taylor achieved the highest televised 3 dart average (to date) of 114.53 surpassing Darryl Fitton's record (114.15) in the International Darts League 2004 against Davy Richardson.

The semi-final line-up contained only one player from the United Kingdom for the first time it the tournament's six-year history. That one player - James Wade, however went on to claim to the title.

Gary Mawson was the first American player to reach the UK Open final, and the first American since Larry Butler in 1994 to reach a major PDC final.

Results

Preliminary round
Best of 11 legs

Johnny Haines 6 V 5 John Kuczynski 
Scott Waites 6 V 0 Scott Mitton 
Paul Whitworth 6 V 2 Mark Jodrill
Nigel Birch 6 V 2 Paul Knighton

Nicky Turner 6 V 3 Gordon Fitzpatrick 
Alan Casey 6 V 1 Alan Green 
Paul Cooper 6 V 2 Michael Barnard
Chris Hornby 6 V 4 Steve Hillier

First round
Best of 11 legs

Jamie Harvey 6 V 1 Richie Burnett 
Robert Thornton 6 V 5 Anastasia Dobromyslova 
Dennis Priestley 6 V 1 Danny King
Dave Honey 6 V 1 Nicky Turner 
Mike Smith 6 V 3 Alan Caves 
Gary Mawson 6 V 5 Darren Johnson 
Dave Johnson 6 V 3 Stuart Pickles
Ian Jopling 6 V 5 Ken Dobson 
Joey Palfreyman 6 V 1 Mel Davies
Martin Burchell 6 V 3 Darren Sutton 
Dave Harris 6 V 3 Mick Savvery 
Alan Casey 6 V 4 Lee Palfreyman
John Quantock 6 V 4 Gary Noonan 
Dan Timmins 6 V 0 Andrew Callary Snr 
Tony Ayres 6 V 3 David Howells
Darren Webster 6 V 1 Chris Hornby

Martyn Turner 6 V 5 Alan Reynolds 
Bob Crawley 6 V 1 Harry Anderson 
Adrian Welsh 6 V 5 David Woodwards
Paul Whitworth 6 V 5 Dave Ladley
Tony Mitchell 6 V 1 Geoff Harkup
Johnny Haines Bye Darren Williams 
Scott Waites 6 V 3 Aaron Turner
Shane Passey 6 V 3 Joe Bata
Sean Palfrey 6 V 5 Jamie Robinson
Lee White 6 V 5 Ryan Francis 
Nigel Birch 6 V 1 Dale Pinch 
Joe Cullen 6 V 0 Mark Stapleton 
Sam Rooney 6 V 1 Ritchie Corner
Justin Pipe 6 V 4 Geoff Wylie 
Paul Cooper 6 V 4 Kevin McDine

Second round
Best of 11 legs

Terry Jenkins 6 V 0 Joey Palfreyman 
Wayne Mardle 6 V 3 Gary Welding
Kevin Painter 6 V 2 Tony Eccles
Matt Clark 6 V 4 Steve Beaton 
Kirk Shepherd 6 V 4 Jan van der Rassel 
Robert Thornton 6 V 2 Bob Crawley
Joe Cullen 6 V 3 Dennis Smith 
Paul Cooper 6 V 1 Carlos Rodriguez
John Magowan Bye Jimmy Mann
Dave Askew 6 V 4 Steve Hine 
Nigel Birch 6 V 5 Shane Passey 
Andy Jenkins 6 V 1 Mike Smith 
Gary Mawson 6 V 0 Mark Frost
Dave Honey 6 V 2 Kevin Dowling
Dennis Priestley 6 V 4 Mick McGowan 

Steve Evans 6 V 4 Owen Caffrey 
David Platt 6 V 4 Martin Burchell 
Tony Ayres 6 V 5 Paul Whitworth 
Jason Clark 6 V 0 Johnny Haines
Steve Smith 6 V 4 Jamie Caven 
Martyn Turner 6 V 1 John Quantock 
Scott Waites 6 V 0 Lee White 
Steve Maish 6 V 1 Ian Jopling 
Alan Warriner-Little 6 V 2 Tony Mitchell
Jason Barry 6 V 5 Adrian Welsh 
Mark Lawrence 6 V 5 Darren Webster 
Justin Pipe 6 V 2 Lionel Sams
John Ferrell 6 V 3 Dan Timmins 
Simon Whatley 6 V 2 Sean Palfrey 
Jamie Harvey 6 V 4 Dave Harris
Alan Casey 6 V 2 Dave Johnson

Third round
Best of 17 legs

Main Stage
M van Gerwen 		7-9 R Thornton
V van der Voort 	9-4 C Lloyd
J Ferrell 		3-9 P Taylor
A Lewis 		9-8 W Mardle
J Part 		9-2 C Monk

Board Two
M King 			8-9 W Newton
T Ayres 		0-9 R van Barneveld
K Painter		3-9 C Osborne
J Wade 			9-3 J Pipe
A Smith 		1-9 T Jenkins

Board Three
K Shepherd 		8-9 W Jones
P Cooper 		7-9 A Tabern
J Klaasen 		9-6 D Askew
M Turner 		6-9 J Harvey

Board Four
M Dudbridge 		9-8 A Warriner-Little
B Bates 		9-4 J Clark
P Manley		9-3 D Honey
S Evans 		8-9 S Whatley

Board Five
N Birch 		9-8 D Priestley
M Walsh 		9-4 R Scholten
A Casey 		2-9 J Barry

Board Six
S Brown 		9-5 K McDine
M Clark 		2-9 A Hamilton
S Smith 		9-7 A Jenkins

Board Seven
S Waites 		9-4 W Atwood
G Mawson 		9-7 A Roy
D Platt 		4-9 M Lawrence
R Baxter 		9-1 S Rooney

Board Eight
J MaGowan 		5-9 B Dolan
S Maish 		9-6 D Ovens
C Mason 		9-5 J Cullen
C Thompson 		9-4 A Gray

Fourth round
Best of 17 legs, 

Main Stage
  J Harvey     1-9 P Taylor   *Phil Taylor hit nine-darter*
  R Baxter 	9-6 S Waites  
  J Barry     7-9 R van Barneveld  
  P Manley 	7-9 M Dudbridge  
  C Osborne 	8-9 V van der Voort 

Board Two
  T Jenkins 	6-9 J Part  
  J Wade 	9-5 S Brown  
  A Hamilton 	9-6 C Mason  
  J Klaasen 	9-3 N Birch  

Board Three
  A Tabern	9-6 R Thornton  
  W Newton 	9-7 M Walsh  
  M Lawrence 	4-9 G Mawson 

Board Four
  W Jones 	9-2 B Bates  
  A Lewis 	8-9 B Dolan  
  S Maish 	5-9 C Thompson  
  S Smith 	6-9 S Whatley

Final Stages

Random draws were made after each round up to the semi final stage. Draw bracket has been compiled retrospectively.

References

External links
UK Open netzone (results & reports) planetdarts.tv

UK Open
UK Open Darts
UK Open
UK Open